Accanthopus is a genus of darkling beetles belonging to the family Tenebrionidae subfamily Tenebrioninae.

Species
 Accanthopus reitteri (Brenske, 1884)
 Accanthopus velikensis (Piller & Mitterpacher, 1783)

References

 Biolib
 Fauna Europaea

Tenebrionidae genera
Beetles of Europe